Đặng Thị Huệ was the favorite consort of Trịnh Sâm, ruler of northern Vietnam from 1767 to 1782. According to histories she used to pick tea-leaves, but gained favour with Trịnh Sâm and was made senior concubine with the title  or Consort Tuyên, the highest rank of the Lord's wife.

Life
She is depicted by subsequent history as having used her influence, although in contrast a stele in Temple of Literature, Hanoi records the rector of the college refusing to pass her younger brother in Vietnam's Confucian exams.

As favourite concubine, she tried make her son Trịnh Cán heir. However, Trịnh Khải organized an army and fought against his half-brother and destroyed all her supporters. She was forced to commit suicide. Her birth and death day are unknown.

She is the subject of the 2010 historical novel Tuyên phi Đặng Thị Huệ by Văn Phú Ngô.

Modern depiction
 Portrayed by Lê Vân in the 1989 movie Đêm hội Long Trì.

References

1780s deaths
People from Hanoi
Princess consorts of Trịnh lords
18th-century Vietnamese women